The Battle of Chaul was a naval battle between the Portuguese and an Egyptian Mamluk fleet in 1508 in the harbour of Chaul in India. The battle ended in a Mamluk victory. It followed the Siege of Cannanore in which a Portuguese garrison successfully resisted an attack by Southern Indian rulers. This was the first Portuguese defeat at sea in the Indian Ocean.

Background
Previously, the Portuguese had been mainly active in Calicut, but the northern region of Gujarat was even more important for trade, and an essential intermediary in east–west trade: the Gujaratis were bringing spices from the Moluccas as well as silk from China, and then selling them to the Egyptians and Arabs.

The Portuguese' monopolizing interventions were however seriously disrupting Indian Ocean trade, threatening Arab as well as Venetian interests, as it became possible for the Portuguese to undersell the Venetians in the spice trade in Europe. Venice broke diplomatic relations with Portugal and started to look at ways to counter its intervention in the Indian Ocean, sending an ambassador to the Egyptian court. Venice negotiated for Egyptian tariffs to be lowered to facilitate competition with the Portuguese, and suggested that "rapid and secret remedies" be taken against the Portuguese. The sovereign of Calicut, the Zamorin, had also sent an ambassador asking for help against the Portuguese.

Since the Mamluks only had little in terms of naval power, timber had to be provided from the Black Sea in order to build the ships, about half of which was intercepted by the Hospitallers of St. John in Rhodes, so that only a fraction of the planned fleet could be assembled at Suez. The timber was then brought overland on camel back, and assembled at Suez under the supervision of Venetian shipwrights.

Preparations
The Mamluk fleet finally left in February 1507 under Amir Husain Al-Kurdi in order to counter the expansion of the Portuguese in the Indian Ocean and arrived in the Indian port of Diu in 1508 after delays subduing the city of Jeddha. It consisted of six round ships and six great galleys called galleasses. 1500 combatants were on board, as well as the ambassador of the Zamorin ruler of Calicut, Mayimama Mārakkār.

The fleet was to join with Malik Ayyaz, a former Russian slave, who was in the service of the Sultan Mahmud Begada of Gujarat Sultanate, who was naval chief and master of Diu. The fleet was also planning to join with the Zamorin of Calicut, and then to raid and destroy all the Portuguese possessions on the Indian coast, but the Zamorin, who was expecting the Mamluk fleet in 1507 had already left.

Battle
The Portuguese, under Lourenço de Almeida, son of the Viceroy Francisco de Almeida, were inferior in number with only a light force, and located in the nearby harbour of Chaul. The rest had sailed north to protect shipping and fight the so-called piracy. The Mamluks sailed into Chaul and fought for two days inconclusively with the Portuguese, unable to board their ships. Finally, Malik Ayaz sailed in with his own galleys. The Portuguese had to retreat and Almeida's ship was sunk at the entrance of Chaul harbour with Almeida aboard. Amir Hussain returned to the port of Diu, but from that point abandoned any further initiative on the Indian coast, his ships becoming derelict and his crews dispersing.

Aftermath
The Portuguese later returned and attacked the fleet in the harbour of Diu, leading to a decisive victory in the Battle of Diu (1509).

These events would be followed by a new Ottoman intervention in 1538, with the Siege of Diu.

See also
 Battle of Cannanore
 Portuguese India

Notes

Chaul
Maritime history of Portugal
Chaul
Portuguese in Kerala
1508 in Portugal
1508 in India
Chaul
Chaul
1508 in the Mamluk Sultanate